Su'ao is a railway station on the Taiwan Railways Administration Yilan line. It is located in Su'ao Township, Yilan County, Taiwan and is the southern terminus of the Yilan line.

The station was opened on 24 March 1919.

There is one side platform.

Around the station

 Coral Museum
 Nanfang'ao Bridge
 Neipi Beach
 Su'ao Cold Spring
 Su'ao Fortress
 Tofu Cape
 Zhu Dayu Culture Museum

See also
 List of railway stations in Taiwan

References

External links

 TRA Su'ao Station 

1919 establishments in Taiwan
Railway stations in Yilan County, Taiwan
Railway stations opened in 1919
Railway stations served by Taiwan Railways Administration